The River Valley Metro Mass Transit District (RVMMTD; River Valley Metro or METRO, for short) is a transit agency that operates buses which serve Kankakee County, Illinois and surrounding areas.

History
Founded in 1998 and operational by 1999, River Valley Metro Mass Transit District took over the Kankakee Area Transit System (KATS) and became a means of transportation in the region. RVMMTD has 11 local fixed routes, 2 commuter routes, and ADA buses serving the communities of Bradley, Bourbonnais, Kankakee, Aroma Park and Manteno. The agency has also received many awards including, Metro Magazine's "Fastest Growing Transit System" in North America for 2001 and "Success in Enhancing Ridership Award" from the Federal Transit Administration in 2008 and 2009.

Renovation and expansion plans
After studying a number of proposals for improving bus service, River Valley Metro added more daily trips to Midway Airport and made significant changes to local routes and schedules in 2017.

Kankakee Transfer Center Upgrade 
The need for an upgrade of the current Kankakee Transfer Center, or Kankakee Metro CENTRE, has been noted since 2010. Preliminary work has begun with an estimated completion in 2022.

Routes
River Valley Metro operates 11 fixed-regular bus routes and 2 commuter routes. The Midway Airport route was added in 2014 and University Park Metra train station commuter route was added in 2008.

Local
1 Meadowview
2 Bradley/Meijer/Target
3 Schuyler/Meijer/WalMart
4 Court Street
5 Aroma Park
6 Indian/Harrison/Del Monte
7 Walmart/KCC/Del Monte
8 East Kankakee / KHS
9 Manteno
10 Bourbonnais / VA
11 Kennedy Dr. / ONU

Commuter
University Park 
Midway

Transfer Centers
There are four transfer centers in the River Valley Metro bus system, which are:
Kankakee Transfer Center in Kankakee. Routes served are: 1, 3, 4, 5, 6, 7, 8 and 11
Northfield Square Mall Transfer Center in Bradley. Routes served are: 2, 3, 9, 10 and 11
Metro Centre Transfer Center in Bourbonnais. Routes served are: 10, University Park Metra Commuter and the Midway Commuter
Manteno Metro Centre Transfer Center in Manteno. Routes served are: 9, University Park Metra Commuter and the Midway Commuter

Fares 

* Reduced fares are applicable on bus for seniors and riders with disabilities.
** All inclusive passes include access to any bus in the system, including University Park and Metro PLUS (ADA).

Fixed Route Bus Ridership

The ridership statistics shown here are of fixed route services only and do not include demand response.

References

External links
Main Page
About The Metro

Bus transportation in Illinois
Kankakee, Illinois
1998 establishments in Illinois
Transit agencies in Illinois